Charmides cerberus, is a species of phasmid or stick insect of the monotypic genus Charmides. It is endemic to Sri Lanka.

References

Phasmatodea
Insects of Asia
Insects described in 1859